"(Our Love) Don't Throw It All Away" is a song penned by Barry Gibb and Blue Weaver and recorded by the Bee Gees in 1977 on the Saturday Night Fever sessions but was not released until Bee Gees Greatest (1979). A different version was released in September 1978 as the third single by Andy Gibb from his second studio album Shadow Dancing.

Andy Gibb's version
The song was Andy Gibb's fifth single to reach the US Top 10; the single reached #9 on the Billboard Hot 100 chart and #2 on the Adult Contemporary chart. When Andy Gibb was going to record it, Barry reworked on the song adding the middle eight that was not on the original Bee Gees' version, as Blue Weaver recalls, "When Andy actually went to record it, Barry listened to it [the original version] again and thought, 'Oh, it's not finished', so Barry wrote the whole of the middle-eight.

Allmusic's Amy Hanson described this version of "(Our Love) Don't Throw It All Away" as a "tender ballad" that suited Andy's voice.  Cash Box said it has "gentle keyboards, strings, an easy beat and harmonies." It appears on Andy's three greatest-hits albums.

Personnel
 Andy Gibb – lead vocals
 Barry Gibb – backing vocals
 Joey Murcia – guitar
 Tim Renwick – guitar
 George Bitzer – Keyboards, synthesizer
 Paul Harris – keyboards
 Harold Cowart – bass
 Joe Lala – percussion
 Ron Ziegler – drums
 Whit Sidener – horns
 Ken Faulk – horns
 Bill Purse – horns
 Neil Bonsanti – horns
 Stan Webb – horns
 Albhy Galuten, Blue Weaver and Barry Gibb – orchestral arrangement

Chart performance

Weekly charts

Year-end charts

Bee Gees' version

The Bee Gees version of the song, the first one created, was recorded in 1977 during the sessions for Saturday Night Fever but was not released until the compilation Bee Gees Greatest 1979. Barry and Maurice Gibb are the only members of the Bee Gees to appear on the recording.

Barry wrote the lyrics while Weaver composed the melody. Weaver said of this song, "That was me playing around again; It wasn't done for [Saturday Night Fever], it was just something that we did". The stereo mix of an early state of the song exists but was unreleased until now. Samantha Sang, who was visiting France where this version was recorded, asked Barry for a song; not long afterwards, Barry sent Sang "Don't Throw it All Away", but Sang never recorded or released it, choosing instead the new song "Emotion".

During the Bee Gees' One Night Only tour, they performed the song with Andy's vocal mixed in during the second stanza, chorus, bridge and the coda of the song years after Andy died.

Personnel
Barry Gibb – vocals, guitar
Maurice Gibb – bass
Blue Weaver – keyboards, orchestral arrangement
Dennis Bryon – drums
Joe Lala – percussion

Other versions
 Jennifer Love Hewitt also covered the song on her 1996 self-titled album. 
 Barbra Streisand recorded her rendition of the song in 2005 off her album Guilty Pleasures, which had Barry Gibb on the album cover with her. On Streisand's version, Barry Gibb is heard singing also the chorus.

References

External links
 

1978 singles
1977 songs
1978 songs
Songs written by Barry Gibb
Songs written by Blue Weaver
Andy Gibb songs
Bee Gees songs
Song recordings produced by Barry Gibb
Song recordings produced by Robin Gibb
Song recordings produced by Maurice Gibb
RSO Records singles
Song recordings produced by Albhy Galuten
Barbra Streisand songs
Pop ballads